Tyler Quincy Dorsey (Greek: Τάιλερ Κουίνσι Ντόρσεϊ, Tailer Kouinsy Ntorsey;February 18, 1996) is an American-Greek professional basketball player for Fenerbahçe of the Turkish BSL and the EuroLeague. He is also a member of the Greek national basketball team. He plays at the shooting guard position. After graduating from Maranatha High School, in Pasadena, California, he played college basketball for the Oregon Ducks.

High school career
Dorsey initially attended Ribét Academy in his freshman season. He then transferred to St. John Bosco High School, in Bellflower, California. In his sophomore season, he began to establish himself as a solid scorer, with a 17.0 points-per-game scoring average. He made a big impact afterwards, where, as a junior, he managed to help his team win the state championship, and was the star of the team, averaging 21.4 points per game, 6.0 rebounds, and 4.7 assists per game.

In his senior year, he decided to transfer to Maranatha, due to his desire to return to his hometown of Pasadena. He was a standout player there, where he dazzled with his scoring and athletic abilities. He averaged 34.0 points per game, to go along with 10.4 rebounds, 3.7 assists, and 1.9 steals per game.

Together with his second state championship win, he earned the 2015 Gatorade State Player of the Year for California award. He had many impressive games, like the one where he scored 52 points, in an 85–60 win. He was able to be efficient in every game, shown by the fact that he finished in double figures in scoring all 30 of his games played. Despite being considered the 23rd-best player of his age group, he was not selected to play in the McDonald's All-American Game. He initially committed to play college basketball at the University of Arizona, but he changed his mind, and then committed to Oregon, instead, on February 2, 2015.

College career

Freshman year
Dorsey played his first official game as an Oregon Duck, in the season opener against Jackson State, where Oregon won; and he was declared the MVP of the game, after scoring 20 points for his team, in an 80–52 win. Dorsey missed two games in the middle of the season, due to an injury, but he soon came back into form. He scored a career-high 25 points against rivals Oregon State, in a 91–81 win.

The Ducks won the Pac-12 regular season and 2016 Conference tournament. In the tournament final against the University Of Utah, Dorsey's team, Oregon, dominated, and beat Utah by a score of 88–57. Oregon's 31-point margin of victory was the largest in the Pac-12 Championship game's history. Dorsey had a stellar performance, being the top scorer, with 23 points, and having also grabbed 9 rebounds. He was picked for the All-Tournament Team, and was the tournament's top scorer.

Oregon earned the top seed in the West region, and went as the number one team of their conference into March Madness. After the season, Dorsey was one out of 162 early-entry candidates that initially declared for the 2016 NBA draft. However, he ultimately withdrew before the draft withdrawal deadline.

Sophomore year
Dorsey helped the Ducks to the finals of the Pac-12 conference tournament, and he was named to the All-Tournament Team. Later, in the NCAA tournament, Dorsey hit numerous shots down the stretch against the University of Rhode Island and the University of Michigan, to lead his team to the Final Four. Oregon was finally defeated by the eventual champions, the North Carolina Tar Heels.

Professional career

Atlanta Hawks (2017–2019)
Dorsey was selected by the Atlanta Hawks, in the 2nd round of the 2017 NBA draft, with 41st overall pick of the draft. He then signed a 2-year contract with the Hawks. On November 12, 2017, Dorsey was sent by Atlanta to the Erie BayHawks, of the NBA G League, on assignment.

Memphis Grizzlies (2019)
On February 7, 2019, Dorsey was traded to the Memphis Grizzlies in exchange for Shelvin Mack. He was assigned to the Memphis Hustle on February 8 and made his debut that evening. By the end of the 2018–19 season, Dorsey was regularly playing crunch-time minutes for the Grizzlies.

Maccabi Tel Aviv (2019–2021)
On August 17, 2019, Dorsey joined Maccabi Tel Aviv of the Israeli Premier League and the EuroLeague, signing a one-year deal with an option for another one. On November 1, 2019, Dorsey recorded a EuroLeague career-high 19 points, shooting 7-of-12 from the field, along with four rebounds, three assists and two steals in a 90–65 win over Olympiacos.

Olympiacos (2021–2022)
On August 20, 2021, Dorsey joined Olympiacos of the Greek Basket League and the EuroLeague, signing a one-year deal.

Dallas Mavericks (2022)
On July 23, 2022, Dorsey signed with the Dallas Mavericks under a two-way contract. On December 26, 2022, Dorsey was waived by the Mavericks.

Texas Legends (2023)
On January 7, 2023, Dorsey was reacquired by the Texas Legends. On February 25, he parted ways with the team.

Fenerbahçe (2023–present)
On March 1, 2023, Dorsey signed with Turkish powerhouse Fenerbahçe Beko through 2025, joining his Greek national team coach Dimitrios Itoudis, as well as his teammates Nick Calathes and Kostas Antetokounmpo.

National team career

Greek junior national team

Dorsey was originally cut from a USA Basketball tryout camp for its Under-18 national team in 2014. The next year, before the 2015 FIBA Under-19 World Cup began, he was invited to Greece's Under-19 national team tryout camp, for which he was eligible due to his mother's Greek family. He turned out to be a vital addition to the team, as he went on to record 15.9 points and 5.0 rebounds per game, and also lead the team in minutes played. The Greek team went 5–2. After winning their first 5 games, they fell to the USA in a tight semi-final, and later lost in the Bronze Medal Game to Turkey. He was voted onto the tournament's best team, despite his team not earning a spot on the medals podium.

Greek senior national team
On June 6, 2016, Dorsey was named to the senior men's Greek national basketball team's 16-man preliminary training camp roster for the 2016 Turin FIBA World Olympic qualifying tournament. He played with the senior team in 3 friendly games, however, he did not make the actual 12-man roster that would compete at the tournament. He played with Greece at the 2019 FIBA World Cup qualification.

Dorsey was on Greece's roster for EuroBasket 2022. On September 2, he scored 27 points in a 89–85 opening day win over Croatia.

Awards and accomplishments

Professional career
Maccabi Tel Aviv
 2× Israeli League Champion (2020, 2021)
Olympiacos
Greek League Winner: (2022)
Greek Cup Winner: (2022)

Individual
 FIBA Under-19 World Cup All-Tournament Team
 Pac-12 All-Freshman Team: (2016)
 First-team Parade All-American (2015)
 Gatorade California Player of the Year: (2015)
Greek Cup MVP: (2022)

Career statistics

NBA

Regular season

|-
| style="text-align:left;"| 
| style="text-align:left;"| Atlanta
| 56 || 5 || 17.4 || .377 || .362 || .714 || 2.3 || 1.4 || .3 || .1 || 7.2
|- 
| style="text-align:left;" rowspan="2"| 
| style="text-align:left;"| Atlanta
| 27 || 0 || 9.3 || .360 || .256 || .615 || 1.6 || 0.6 || .3 || .0 || 3.3
|- 
| style="text-align:left;"| Memphis
| 21 || 11 || 21.3 || .429 || .366 || .629 || 3.3 || 1.9 || .3 || .0 || 9.8
|-
| style="text-align:left;"| 
| style="text-align:left;"| Dallas
| 3 || 0 || 2.7 || .800 || .500 || – || .7 || .0 || .0 || .0 || 3.0
|- class="sortbottom"
| style="text-align:center;" colspan="2"| Career
| 107 || 16 || 15.7 || .392 || .351 || .669 || 2.3 || 1.3 || .3 || .1 || 6.6

NBA G League

Regular season

|-
| style="text-align:left;"| 2017–18
| style="text-align:left;"| Erie
| 10 || 8 || 33.3 || .424 || .427 || .759 || 6.5 || 2.5 || 1.2 || .2 || 19.1
|- class="sortbottom"
| style="text-align:center;" colspan="2"| Career
| 10 || 8 || 33.3 || .424 || .427 || .759 || 6.5 || 2.5 || 1.2 || .2 || 19.1

College

|-
| style="text-align:left;"| 2015–16
| style="text-align:left;"| Oregon
| 36 || 35 || 30.1 || .441 || .406 || .712 || 4.3 || 2.0 || .8 || .2 || 13.4
|-
| style="text-align:left;"| 2016–17
| style="text-align:left;"| Oregon
| 39 || 39 || 30.0 || .467 || .423 || .755 || 3.5 || 1.7 || .8 || .1 || 14.6
|- class="sortbottom"
| style="text-align:center;" colspan="2"| Career
| 75 || 74 || 30.0 || .455 || .416 || .732 || 3.9 || 1.8 || .8 || .1 || 14.1

Personal life
Dorsey acquired dual citizenship (full citizenship with both the United States and Greece) and a Greek passport, due to his mother's Greek background. His mother, Samia Konstantinidou, was born in Jerusalem to a Greek father and an Israeli mother. Dorsey's father is African-American.

References

Sources
 Blue-chip basketball recruit Tyler Dorsey to transfer out of St. John Bosco to Maranatha
 National POY Watch: Maranatha guard Tyler Dorsey looks to lead his team to a California state championship
 Column: Maranatha's Tyler Dorsey ready for a run at another state title
 Oregon Ducks 5-star commit will not sign National Letter of Intent
 Doing it the right way: How Tyler Dorsey exemplifies humility in a game full of egos
 DraftExpress – Tyler Dorsey DraftExpress Profile: Stats, Comparisons, and Outlook
 Tyler Dorsey Stats, News, Bio
 Tyler Dorsey
 
 http://www.oregonlive.com/ducks/index.ssf/2016/02/tyler_dorsey_and_the_oregon_du.htm;
 Tyler DORSEY at the FIBA U19 World Championship 2015

External links
 ESPN.com profile
 FIBA profile
 Hellenic Basketball Federation profile 
 Oregon Ducks bio

1996 births
Living people
American expatriate basketball people in Greece
American expatriate basketball people in Israel
American expatriate basketball people in Turkey
American men's basketball players
American people of Greek descent
Atlanta Hawks draft picks
Atlanta Hawks players
Basketball players from Pasadena, California
Dallas Mavericks players
Erie BayHawks (2017–2019) players
Greek men's basketball players
Greek people of American descent
Greek expatriate basketball people in Israel
Greek expatriate basketball people in Turkey
Greek expatriate basketball people in the United States
Maccabi Tel Aviv B.C. players
Memphis Grizzlies players
Memphis Hustle players
National Basketball Association players from Greece
Oregon Ducks men's basketball players
Parade High School All-Americans (boys' basketball)
Shooting guards